Marty Engel (January 25, 1932 – January 29, 2022) was an American athlete. He competed in the men's hammer throw at the 1952 Summer Olympics.

He competed for Team USA in the hammer throw in the 1953 Maccabiah Games, winning a gold medal in the hammer throw and a bronze medal in the shot put. He also competed for the U.S. in the 1957 Maccabiah Games, and won a gold medal in the hammer throw, a gold medal in the shot put, and a bronze medal in discus.

Engel served in the United States Army. He died on January 29, 2022, four days after his 90th birthday.

References

External links
 

1932 births
2022 deaths
Athletes (track and field) at the 1952 Summer Olympics
American male hammer throwers
Olympic track and field athletes of the United States
Military personnel from New York City
Track and field athletes from New York City
Pan American Games medalists in athletics (track and field)
Pan American Games silver medalists for the United States
Pan American Games bronze medalists for the United States
Athletes (track and field) at the 1955 Pan American Games
Medalists at the 1955 Pan American Games
Competitors at the 1953 Maccabiah Games
Competitors at the 1957 Maccabiah Games
Maccabiah Games gold medalists for the United States
Maccabiah Games bronze medalists for the United States
Maccabiah Games athletes (track and field)